The  are helicopter destroyers in service with the Japan Maritime Self-Defense Force (JMSDF). The official classification of these ships is DDH (helicopter-carrying destroyer), which is accepted by the United States Naval Institute; in contrast, Jane's Fighting Ships describes this official classification, but the classification is simply "helicopter carrier".

The ships of this class are currently the largest surface combatants of the JMSDF, taking over the mantle previously held by the s. The lead ship was officially unveiled at Yokohama on 6 August 2013. Both ships of the class could operate STOVL Lockheed Martin F-35B Lightning II aircraft after modifications.

Development
The Japanese Ministry of Defense (MOD) first announced plans for the class on 23 November 2009. This ship's primary mission is anti-submarine warfare (ASW) but peacekeeping and disaster relief operations are also being considered.

The ship carries up to 28 aircraft. However, only 7 ASW helicopters and 2 search and rescue (SAR) helicopters are planned for the initial aircraft complement. For other operations, 400 troops and 50 3.5 ton trucks (or equivalent equipment) can also be carried. The flight deck has 5 helicopter landing spots that allow simultaneous landings or take-offs. The ship is equipped with 2 Phalanx CIWS and 2 SeaRAM for its defense.

In 2010, Forecast International reported that some design features were intended to support fixed wing aircraft such as the Bell Boeing V-22 Osprey and Lockheed Martin F-35 Lightning II, although neither the MOD nor the JMSDF have mentioned the possibility of introducing carrier-based fixed-wing aircraft. The ship has neither a "ski-jump" nor a catapult, typical features for launching fixed-wing aircraft.

The construction of the first ship of the class began in 2011 at an IHI Marine United shipyard in Yokohama, with funding totalling 113.9 billion yen ($1.5 billion) being set aside in the fiscal 2010 budget for this purpose.

Ships in the class
In September 2011, The Asahi Shimbun reported that the Ministry of Defence was to proceed with a budget request calling for funds for the construction of the planned second unit in the class. The request was approved and the construction contract was awarded to IHI Corporation in October 2012. This will come under the Defense Ministry's Mid-Term Defense Program FY2011-2015. The first ship in the class, Izumo was launched on 6 August 2013. The ship was commissioned on 25 March 2015.

Izumo was named after  (present-day Shimane Prefecture), and Kaga after  (present-day Ishikawa Prefecture).

Modifications to accommodate STOVL operations

On 6 August 2013,  was unveiled in Yokohama, south of Tokyo, Japan. Japanese officials claimed it would be used in national defense, specifically citing anti-submarine warfare and border-area surveillance missions. Additionally, it is also asserted to bolster Japan's ability to transport personnel and supplies in response to large-scale disasters. This unveiling occurred at a time of heightened tensions over the Senkaku Islands.

The Washington Post noted that this ship – the biggest warship in Japan's fleet since World War II – "has raised eyebrows in China and elsewhere because it bears a strong resemblance to a conventional aircraft carrier" and has been described by the Chinese as an "aircraft-carrier in disguise." Though called a destroyer, some experts believed the new Japanese ship could potentially be used in the future to launch fighter jets (F-35B) or other fixed wing aircraft.

Japanese military sources confirmed that the possibility of operating fixed wing aircraft was incorporated into the design of the ships from the earliest stages of the Izumo program, but this was not made public because Article 9 of the Japanese Constitution prohibits Japan from possessing offensive military weapons such as aircraft carriers. The aircraft elevators and the deck paint were designed to handle aircraft like the F-35B, and it would be possible to add a ski-jump to the flight deck for STOVL operations.

In December 2017, several sources including Reuters and Yomiuri Shimbun reported that the Japanese government was contemplating modifying the Izumo class to operate F-35B STOVL aircraft. Multiple plans were reportedly under consideration, some of which call for US Marine Corps F-35s to use the vessels while others for Japan to procure its own aircraft. The plan quickly raised criticism from China, where government officials reacted negatively and urged Japan to "act cautiously".

Later, in February 2018, the Yomiuri Shimbun reported that Japan was planning to acquire 40 F-35Bs, the Short Take-off and Vertical Landing (STOVL) variant of the Lockheed Martin Lightning II Joint Strike Fighter (JSF), which could be operated from the Izumo class with some modifications to the ships. It was estimated that each Izumo-class carrier could operate 12 or more F-35B aircraft. In March that same year, the ruling Liberal Democratic Party called upon the Japanese government to develop its own aircraft carriers and operate F-35B aircraft, which has been thought to include refitting the Izumo class. Defence Minister Takeshi Iwaya announced on 27 November 2018 that Japan is considering buying F-35Bs within an order for an additional 100 F-35 aircraft, and as a consequence modifying both Izumo-class helicopter carriers to operate F-35B were also considered.

Approval of conversion 

On 18 December 2018, the Japanese Cabinet gave approval to modify the Izumo class into de facto aircraft carriers. The modifications will reinforce the decks of the Izumo-class ships to support the additional weight of F-35B, as well as the heat and forces from the jets during vertical landing. Each vessel will also have the bow section of its flight deck, which is currently trapezoidal, modified into a square shape. The ruling parties re-designated the Izumo-class ships to multi-purpose operation destroyers. On 30 December 2019, Japanese Ministry of Defense approved the FY2020 budget that would finance the refurbishment of the Izumo class for F-35B operation.

The United States Marine Corps plans to operate their own STOVL F-35s from Izumo-class ships in cooperation with the ship's crew to build up a Japanese capability to operate this type of aircraft. The Japan Air Self-Defense Force has ordered 42 STOVL F-35Bs in 2019 and will operate them from land bases once delivered. In July 2021 it was indicated that of the 42 F-35B variants to be acquired, 18 will be introduced by FY2023, six in FY2024 and two in FY2025. These are to form a single squadron consisting of about 20 aircraft operating from the Nyutabaru Air Base in Miyazaki Prefecture in southwestern Japan. The base is located in close proximity to the JMSDF's Kure Base in Hiroshima Prefecture, which is the home port of JS Kaga.

The Asahi Shimbun quotes Japan's Defense Minister Takeshi Iwaya "The Izumo-class aircraft carrier role is to strengthen the air defense in the Pacific Ocean and to ensure the safety of the Self-Defense Force pilots." He also states, "there may be no runway available for the US aircraft in an emergency. I cannot say that the US F-35B should never be placed on an [JMSDF] escort vessel."

In 2020, Izumo began the conversion process. Initial modifications include strengthening the heat resistance of the deck and installing power supply equipment to enable the departure and arrival of the F-35B. A second renovation, to change the bow shape to a quadrangle for the safe operation of the F-35B and the maintenance of the interior compartments, is scheduled to be carried out starting from the end of 2024. 

Kaga began her initial modifications in March 2022 at the Japan Marine United (JMU) shipyard in Kure, Hiroshima Prefecture. The proposed modification of Kaga will be more extensive (and significantly more expensive) and includes changes to the shape of the bow. The initial modification of Kaga is expected to take 14 months, followed by a second modification of the ship’s interior, which is expected to begin in March 2027. 

On 3 October 2021, two USMC F-35Bs performed the first vertical landings and horizontal take-offs from JS Izumo, marking the first time in more than 75 years that a fixed-wing aircraft operated from a Japanese carrier.

See also
Sea Control Ship

References

Bibliography

External links

CG Photos of 19500t class 22DDH destroyer Ships of the World
22DDH Class GlobalSecurity.org
Illustrations of 22DDH class GlobalSecurity.org

 
Helicopter carrier classes